George Denison (1822–1902) was an Ontario farmer and political figure. He represented Addington in the Legislative Assembly of Ontario from 1883 to 1886. He had been associated with the Canada First movement and later developed imperialist ideologies.

He was born in County Leitrim, Ireland, in 1822 and came to Frontenac County, Upper Canada, as an infant. The family first settled near Collins Bay but later moved to Portland Township. Denison was a justice of the peace and a captain in the local militia. He served as reeve for Portland Township and was warden for Frontenac County in 1879.

References

External links 
The Canadian parliamentary companion, 1885 JA Gemmill

History of the County of Lennox and Addington, WS Herrington (1913)

1822 births
1902 deaths
Progressive Conservative Party of Ontario MPPs
Irish emigrants to pre-Confederation Ontario
Mayors of places in Ontario
Politicians from County Leitrim
People from County Leitrim
Canadian nationalists
Canadian justices of the peace